Eberhard Probst (born 4 June 1955) is a German former wrestler. He competed at the 1976 Summer Olympics and the 1980 Summer Olympics.

References

External links
 

1955 births
Living people
German male sport wrestlers
Olympic wrestlers of East Germany
Wrestlers at the 1976 Summer Olympics
Wrestlers at the 1980 Summer Olympics
People from Querfurt
Sportspeople from Saxony-Anhalt